Heart 80s is a national digital radio station owned and operated by Global as a spin-off from Heart. The station broadcasts from studios at Leicester Square in London.

Launched on 14 March 2017, Heart 80s is a rolling music service playing non-stop “feel good” music from the 1980s. It has its own dedicated live breakfast show, hosted by Roberto, 6–10am weekdays and 8am – noon each Saturday. At other times, the station is mostly an automated service.

The station broadcasts nationally on Digital One DAB and online alongside the existing Heart extra service. Shortly after its launch it replaced Heart Extra on television platforms.

On 28 August 2019, the station switched its Digital One service from broadcasting in mono using DAB to a stereo service in the DAB+ standard. The surplus capacity vacated by this move was used the following day to add another sibling, Heart 90s in DAB+.

References

External links 

1980s
Global Radio
Radio stations established in 2017
1980s-themed radio stations